Enterprise Singapore (ESG) is a statutory board under the Ministry of Trade and Industry of the Government of Singapore. It was formed on 1 April 2018 to support Singapore small and medium enterprise (SMEs) development, upgrade capabilities, innovate, transform, and internationalise. It also supports the growth of Singapore as a trading and startup hub, and continues to be the national standards and accreditation body.

History 
Enterprise Singapore was formed through the merger of International Enterprise Singapore (IE) and SPRING Singapore. It is an integration of IE Singapore and SPRING Singapore’s functions. SPRING Singapore was responsible for helping startups and SMEs in financing, capability and management development, technology and innovation. It was the national body for standards and accreditation, responsible for helping companies achieve international standards and conformity requirements.

International Enterprise Singapore promoted international trade and helped Singapore companies expand internationally.

On February 5, the Singapore Parliament passed a bill to officiate the new statutory board. During the second reading that occurred on the same day, Minister for Trade and Industry S Iswaran said  "the goals of capacity building, innovation and international expansion are deeply intertwined and reinforced one another. A company must innovate and deepen its capabilities to successfully expand into overseas markets. Equally, venturing overseas will itself create the scale, impetus and opportunity for businesses to gain new capabilities and expertise… so it is necessary and timely to merge the functions and operations of IE and SPRING to form Enterprise Singapore".

Responsibilities

Developing trading cluster 
The agency attracts global commodity traders to establish their global or Asian home base in Singapore. Singapore is currently the trading hub of the three clusters of metals and minerals, agri-commodities, and energy and chemicals.

Quality and Standards 
Enterprise Singapore governs the national standards of Singapore. Through the industry led Singapore Standards Council, it administers the Singapore Standardisation Programme, which develops and promotes standards to meet industry needs and government policy objectives. The Council consists of representatives of various stakeholders including industry representatives, professional bodies, trade and consumer associations, academia, and government agencies. It develops a consensus based Standards in Singapore and promotes them to be accepted and adopted by stakeholders.

The agency is also the national accreditation body. Enterprise Singapore manages the Singapore Accreditation Council (SAC) that looks at developing and managing accreditation schemes to support Singapore’s strategic initiatives such as market access, security, and safety and health. It also manages the Good Laboratory Practice (GLP) Compliance Programme that ensures facilities’ processes and laboratory studies meet international standards. Studies conducted in Singapore under GLP complaint conditions have been accepted in more than 30 OECD and non-OECD countries.

Support for businesses 
Enterprise Singapore supports enterprises of all sizes and stages of development, including startups, SMEs, and large corporations.

 For startups, it partners with incubators, angel investors, and government agencies to develop the startup ecosystem in Singapore through the slew of programmes managed by Startup SG.
 For SMEs, it provides assistance in improving business capabilities through various grants and programmes, as well as access to technology and research institutes. It also supports SMEs that expand overseas through tax deductions, grant funds, the Plug and Play Network, and over 22 Free Trade Agreements.
 Large corporations receive assistance from Enterprise Singapore in expanding their global market reach and source for new opportunities. There are also initiatives such as the PACT programme where they lead smaller companies in joint projects.

Internationalisation efforts 
Enterprise Singapore has built a global network for SMEs.

Overseas markets 
Enterprise Singapore maintains overseas centres in various markets to support the internationalisation of Singaporean businesses. There are a total of 36 overseas centres in 21 countries. China alone hosts 9 centres. The centres are clustered in the geographical regions of Southeast Asia & Oceania, North & South China, East & West China, North and South Asia, Middle East and Africa, North America & Europe, and Emerging Europe, Latin America & the Caribbean.

Plug and Play Network 
The agency has 9 Plug and Play partners in 6 countries. It provides specific market research into the target markets, provides a global database to help search for business partners overseas, provide in-market support such as matching suppliers and distributors, and source for workspaces.

Bilateral Business Forums 
Business Forums are organised for delegates and officials of both Singapore and partner countries to discuss business partnership opportunities, domestic opportunities, business trends and future directions. Thus far Enterprise Singapore has organised Business Forums with India, Latin America, Bangladesh, Germany, among others.

See also 
 Ministry of Trade and Industry
 Government of Singapore
 Economy of Singapore
 International Enterprise
 SPRING Singapore

References

External links 
 Enterprise Singapore

Economy of Singapore
Government of Singapore
Statutory boards of the Singapore Government
2018 establishments in Singapore
Government agencies established in 2018